Jean Rollin was a French director, producer, screenwriter, novelist and actor. In a career spanning over five decades, Rollin began as an actor and experimental filmmaker of short projects, before moving on to create mainstream films. His works remain notable for their unique cinematic style, mixing stunning visuals with a dream-like atmosphere; although the majority of his films fall within the fantastique or horror genres, many themes and subgenres are present, including, melodrama, eroticism, and adventure, and to a lesser extent, crime, gore, Satanism, and films which have depicted the subjects of mental illness and memory disorder, while his most recognisable work being the recurring theme of vampirism.

Throughout his career, most of Rollin's films were met with criticism and hostility, and due to negative response, he found it difficult to receive financial support for his intended projects, and as an alternative, turned to the pornographic industry, working under several pseudonyms, in order to raise the funds to produce mainstream films. In later years, Rollin's work as a filmmaker has become more appreciated, while his films are now considered cult classics, earning him the Lifetime Achievement Award at the Fantasia International Film Festival in 2007, for his contribution to fantastical cinema.

Films

Main films

Other films

Short films

Adult films

Actor

Other works
 Drôles d'histoires (TV series, writer, episode: "Cabinet particulier", 1989)

Unfinished works
 L'itinéraire marin (1963, director and writer)
 Beastiality (1985), a werewolf film which was set to star Brigitte Lahaie.
 Détectives de charme (1991)
 Le retour de Dracula (1992), a proposed TV series which was set to air on France 3.

Recurring collaborators
Key
  = Acting role
  = No appearance
  = Voice only

Notes

References

External links

Rollin, Jean
Rollin, Jean